The 1997 Bank of Ireland All-Ireland Senior Football Championship was the 111th staging of the All-Ireland Senior Football Championship, the Gaelic Athletic Association's premier inter-county Gaelic football tournament. The championship began on 11 May 1997 and ended on 28 September 1997.

Meath entered the championship as the defending champions; however, they were defeated by Offaly in the Leinster final.

On 28 September 1997 Kerry, the most successful county in Gaelic football history, claimed their 31st All-Ireland title - and their first since 1986 - with a 0–13 to 1–7 victory over Mayo.

This year also saw Ulster's most successful county, Cavan, win their first provincial title since 1969.

Munster Championship format change
A new 2 year system was introduced in Munster meaning that Kerry, Cork & Clare would have straight access to the Munster semi-finals  for Limerick, Tipperary & Waterford would play in a Preliminary Round and the bye team in a lone Quarter final involved.

Fixtures and results

Munster Senior Football Championship

Preliminary round

Quarter-final

Semi-finals

Final

Leinster Senior Football Championship

First round

Second round

 

Quarter-finals

 

Semi-finals

 
 

Final

Connacht Senior Football Championship

Quarter-finals

Semi-finals

 

Final

Ulster Senior Football Championship

Preliminary round

Quarter-finals

 

 
 

Semi-finals

Final

All-Ireland Senior Football Championship

Semi-finals

Final

Championship statistics

Top scorers

Overall

Single game

Miscellaneous

 On 11 May 1997, O'Kennedy Park, New Ross hosted its 1st game for 53 years it was the drawn game between Wexford vs Westmeath. 
 Clare record their first win over Cork since 1941.
 Cavan win their first Ulster title since 1969 and last until 2020.
 Offaly won their first Leinster title since 1982.
 All Ireland semi-final Mayo vs Offaly was the first championship meeting between them.
 Kerry end their longest drought as All Ireland Champions of 11 years.